Optic neuritis describes any condition that causes inflammation of the optic nerve; it may be associated with demyelinating diseases, or infectious or inflammatory processes.

It is also known as optic papillitis (when the head of the optic nerve is involved), neuroretinitis (when there is a combined involvement of the optic disc and surrounding retina in the macular area) and retrobulbar neuritis (when the posterior part of the nerve is involved). Prelaminar optic neuritis describes involvement of the non-myelinated axons in the retina. It is most often associated with multiple sclerosis, and it may lead to complete or partial loss of vision in one or both eyes. Other causes include:

 Leber's hereditary optic neuropathy
 Parainfectious optic neuritis (associated with viral infections such as measles, mumps, chickenpox, whooping cough and glandular fever)
 Infectious optic neuritis (sinus related or associated with cat-scratch fever, tuberculosis, Lyme disease and cryptococcal meningitis in AIDS patients
 Autoimmune causes (sarcoidosis, systemic lupus erythematosus, polyarteritis nodosa, MOG antibody disease, granulomatosis with polyangiitis)
 Diabetes mellitus
 Low phosphorus levels
 Hyperkalaemia

Partial, transient vision loss (lasting less than one hour) can be an indication of early onset multiple sclerosis.

Signs and symptoms 

Major symptoms are sudden loss of vision (partial or complete), sudden blurred or "foggy" vision, and pain on movement of the affected eye. Early symptoms that require investigation include symptoms from multiple sclerosis (twitching, lack of coordination, slurred speech, frequent episodes of partial vision loss or blurred vision), episodes of "disturbed/blackened" rather than blurry indicate moderate stage and require immediate medical attention to prevent further loss of vision. Other early symptoms are reduced night vision, photophobia and red eyes. Many patients with optic neuritis may lose some of their color vision in the affected eye (especially red), with colors appearing subtly washed out compared to the other eye. Patients may also experience difficulties judging movement in depth, which can be particular troublesome during driving or sport (Pulfrich effect). Likewise, transient worsening of vision with increase of body temperature (Uhthoff's phenomenon) and glare disability are a frequent complaint. However, several case studies in children have demonstrated the absence of pain in more than half of cases (approximately 60%) in their pediatric study population, with the most common symptom reported simply as "blurriness." Other remarkable differences between the presentation of adult optic neuritis as compared to pediatric cases include more often unilateral optic neuritis in adults, while children much predominantly present with bilateral involvement.

On medical examination the head of the optic nerve can easily be visualized by a slit lamp with a high positive lens or by using direct ophthalmoscopy; however, frequently there is no abnormal appearance of the nerve head in optic neuritis (in cases of retrobulbar optic neuritis), though it may be swollen in some patients (anterior papillitis or more extensive optic neuritis). In many cases, only one eye is affected, and patients may not be aware of the loss of color vision until they are asked to close or cover the healthy eye.

Cause 
The optic nerve comprises axons that emerge from the retina of the eye and carry visual information to the primary visual nuclei, most of which is relayed to the occipital cortex of the brain to be processed into vision. Inflammation of the optic nerve causes loss of vision, usually because of the swelling and destruction of the myelin sheath covering the optic nerve.

The most common cause is multiple sclerosis (MS) or ischemic optic neuropathy due to thrombosis or embolism of the vessel that supplies the optic nerve. Up to 50% of patients with MS will develop an episode of optic neuritis, and 20-30% of the time optic neuritis is the presenting sign of MS. The presence of demyelinating white matter lesions on brain MRI at the time of presentation of optic neuritis is the strongest predictor for developing clinically definite MS. Almost half of the patients with optic neuritis have white matter lesions consistent with multiple sclerosis.

Some other common causes of optic neuritis include infection (e.g. a tooth abscess in the upper jaw, syphilis, Lyme disease, herpes zoster), autoimmune disorders (e.g. lupus, neurosarcoidosis, neuromyelitis optica), methanol poisoning, vitamin B12 deficiency, beriberi, dysautonomia (i.e. autonomic nervous system dysfunction), and diabetes, or an injury to the eye. In neuromyelitis optica higher AQP4 autoantibody levels are associated with the occurrence of optic neuritis.

Less common causes are: papilledema, brain tumor or abscess in the occipital region, cerebral trauma or hemorrhage, meningitis, arachnoidal adhesions, sinus thrombosis, liver dysfunction, or late stage kidney disease.

Demyelinating recurrent optic neuritis and non-demyelinating (CRION) 

The repetition of an idiopathic optic neuritis is considered a distinct clinical condition, and when it shows demyelination, it has been found to be associated to anti-MOG and AQP4-negative neuromyelitis optica.

When an inflammatory recurrent optic neuritis is not demyelinating, it is called chronic relapsing inflammatory optic neuropathy (CRION).

When it is anti-MOG related, it is demyelinating and it is considered inside the anti-MOG associated inflammatory demyelinating diseases.

Some reports point to the possibility to establish a difference via optical coherence tomography.

Treatment 
In most MS-associated optic neuritis, visual function spontaneously improves over 2–3 months, and there is evidence that corticosteroid treatment does not affect the long term outcome. However, for optic neuritis that is not MS-associated (or atypical optic neuritis) the evidence is less clear and therefore the threshold for treatment with intravenous corticosteroids is lower. Intravenous corticosteroids also reduce the risk of developing MS in the following two years in patients with MRI lesions; but this effect disappears by the third year of follow up.

Paradoxically, oral administration of corticosteroids in this situation may lead to more recurrent attacks than in non-treated patients (though oral steroids are generally prescribed after the intravenous course, to wean the patient off the medication). This effect of corticosteroids seems to be limited to optic neuritis and has not been observed in other diseases treated with corticosteroids.

A Cochrane systematic review studied the effect of corticosteroids for treating people with acute optic neuritis. Specific corticosteroids studied included intravenous and oral methylprednisone, and oral prednisone. The authors conclude that current evidence does not show a benefit of either intravenous or oral corticosteroids for rate of recovery of vision (in terms of visual acuity, contrast sensitivity, or visual fields). There are a number of reasons why this might be the case.

Epidemiology 
Optic neuritis typically affects young adults ranging from 18–45 years of age, with a mean age of 30–35 years. There is a strong female predominance. The annual incidence is approximately 5/100,000, with a prevalence estimated to be 115/100,000.

Society and culture 
In Charles Dickens' Bleak House, the main character, Esther Summerville, has a transient episode of visual loss, the symptoms of which are also seen in people who have optic neuritis. Legal historian William Searle Holdsworth suggested that the events in Bleak House took place in 1827.

In an episode of Dr. Quinn, Medicine Woman ("Season of Miracles", season five), Reverend Timothy Johnson is struck blind by optic neuritis on Christmas Day 1872. He remains blind for the duration of the series.

See also 
 Optic neuropathy
 Visual snow

References

External links 

Autoimmune diseases
Disorders of optic nerve and visual pathways